was a JR East railway station located in Rikuzentakata, Iwate Prefecture, Japan. The station, as well as most of the structures in the surrounding area, was destroyed by the 2011 Tōhoku earthquake and tsunami and has now been replaced by a provisional bus rapid transit line.

Lines
Rikuzen-Takata Station was served by the Ōfunato Line, and is located 85.4 rail kilometers from the terminus of the line at Ichinoseki Station.

Station layout
Rikuzen-Takata Station had two opposed side platforms, connected by a level crossing. The station had a Midori no Madoguchi staffed ticket office.

Platforms

History
Rikuzen-Takata Station opened on 15 December 1933. The station was absorbed into the JR East network upon the privatization of the Japan National Railways (JNR) on April 1, 1987. The station was one of six stations on the Ōfunato Line destroyed by the 11 March 2011 Tōhoku earthquake and tsunami, which also killed the station staff. Services have now been replaced by a BRT.

Surrounding area
Rikuzen-Takata city hall
Rikuzen-Takata bus terminal
Rikuzen-Takata Post Office
Takata-matsubara

See also
 List of railway stations in Japan

External links

  

Railway stations in Iwate Prefecture
Ōfunato Line
Railway stations in Japan opened in 1933
Railway stations closed in 2011
Rikuzentakata, Iwate
Stations of East Japan Railway Company